Tommy Ho and Brett Steven were the defending champions but only Steven competed that year with Sandon Stolle.

Steven and Stolle lost in the first round to Jonas Björkman and Stefan Edberg.

Todd Woodbridge and Mark Woodforde won in the final 1–6, 6–2, 6–2 against Brian MacPhie and Michael Tebbutt.

Seeds
The top four seeded teams received byes into the second round.

Draw

Final

Top half

Bottom half

References
 1996 Newsweek Champions Cup Doubles Draw

Doubles
1996 Newsweek Champions Cup and the State Farm Evert Cup